Santa Cruz is an interchange station metro station on Line 1 (Blue) and Line 5 (Lilac) of the São Paulo Metro in the Vila Mariana district of São Paulo, Brazil.

SPTrans lines
The following SPTrans bus lines can be accessed. Passengers may use a Bilhete Único card for transfer:

References

São Paulo Metro stations
Railway stations opened in 1974
1974 establishments in Brazil
Railway stations opened in 2018
2018 establishments in Brazil
Railway stations located underground in Brazil